The Funeral Pyre was an American blackened death metal band from La Habra, California. The band released four studio albums and various shorter works before playing their last advertised show in 2012.

History
The band was formed in La Habra, California, in 2001 by guitarist James Joyce, keyboardist Daniella Jones, vocalist John Strachan, drummer Alex Hernandez, and bassist Adam Campbell, initially adopting the name Envilent. They participated in the underground extreme music scenes across L.A. and Orange counties. They have acclaim amongst metal internet press outlets for their Swedish-style melody, ethereal keyboards, and blackened vocals.

The band released several demos and the EP Whispering to the Shadows before changing its name to The Funeral Pyre prior to the 2003 release of their EP October. A year later the band released its first full-length album, Immersed by the Flames of Mankind.

In August 2006, the band released their second full-length album The Nature of Betrayal, which was recorded at Ulug studios in Costa Mesa, California, through Creator-Destructor Records, an independent California based recording studio. Initial internet-based sales enabled a distribution deal with Prosthetic Records, and The Nature of Betrayal was re-released in March 2007. The period that followed saw numerous changes in membership: longtime keyboardist Daniella Jones who parted with the band for "musical differences", was briefly replaced by a second guitarist, Justin Garcia, who was in turn replaced by Lanny Perelman, who left the band as well.

A third album, Wounds was recorded in January and February 2008 with producer John Haddad and released in May of that year. The band has more closely embraced black metal entirely with the release of Wounds, as well as later works.

An EP, December, was recorded during December 2008, and received a limited distribution by Creator-Destructor in March 2009. A 7-inch split with Landmine Marathon was released shortly after through Forest Moon Special Products.

The band's fourth and final studio album, Vultures at Dawn was released in June 2010 by Prosthetic Records. It was generally well received, much of the praise coming from the more experimental songs "Monolith" and "To Watch the Earth Rot", both being further from their normal genre of songwriting.

Members

Current members
James Joyce - guitar
Alex Hernandez - drums
John Strachan - vocals
Adam Campbell - bass

Former members
Jason Dunn - guitar
Daniella Jones - keyboards
Justin Garcia - guitar
Lanny Perelman - guitar
Alex Lopez - guitar

Discography
Studio albums
2004: Immersed by the Flames of Mankind
2006: The Nature of Betrayal
2008: Wounds
2010: Vultures at Dawn

EPs
2002: Whispering to the Shadows EP
2003: October EP
2006: The First Book of the Kings (split EP)
2009: December EP
2009: The Funeral Pyre/Landmine Marathon (Split EP)

References

External links
Official website

American melodic death metal musical groups
Blackened death metal musical groups
Black metal musical groups from California
Death metal musical groups from California
Musical groups from Orange County, California
Musical quintets
Musical groups established in 2001
La Habra, California